or  is a small village in Balsfjord Municipality in Troms og Finnmark county, Norway. Two major highways, European route E6 and European route E8, meet in this village, making it a major crossroads in Northern Norway, with an estimated annual passage of 3 million people. Nordkjosbotn Church is located in this village. Macks Ølbryggeri, a brewery, has been operating in Nordkjosbotn since 2012.

Location
Nordkjosbotn is located at the end of the Nordkjosen branch of the Balsfjorden where the river Nordkjoselva meets the fjord.

Gallery

References

Villages in Troms
Populated places of Arctic Norway
Balsfjord